Resistance to interrogation, RTI or R2I is a type of military training to British and other NATO soldiers to prepare them, after capture by the enemy, to resist interrogation techniques such as humiliation and torture.

The trainees undergo practices such as hooding, sleep deprivation, time disorientation, prolonged nakedness, sexual humiliation and deprivation of warmth, water and food. Many of these techniques are against international law if used in interrogations.

In such interrogation sessions, the subjects must maintain dead silence regardless of the practice being inflicted on them. Only three pieces of information can be surrendered: name, rank and serial number. Both the subjects and the practitioner have a right to insist for a return to unit every hour.

Standard RTI for most special military branches of American and European governments covers both tortures that are condemned by the United Nations and interrogation techniques that are considered legitimate, usually presented along a sliding scale. For instance, a soldier would be subjected to slight discomforts before being subjected to more torturous techniques.

The Guardian has reported that according to a former British special forces officer, the acts committed by U.S. Army soldiers who committed torture and prisoner abuse at Abu Ghraib resembled the techniques used in RTI training.

See also
Defence Survive, Evade, Resist, Extract Training Organisation
Pride-and-ego down
Survival, Evasion, Resistance and Escape

References

Abu Ghraib torture and prisoner abuse
Interrogation techniques
Psychological warfare
Interrogations